Xylota steyskali is a species of hoverfly in the family Syrphidae.

Distribution
Taiwan.

References

Eristalinae
Insects described in 1975
Taxa named by F. Christian Thompson
Diptera of Asia